Philinoglossidae is a family of marine snails, gastropod molluscs in the superfamily Philinoidea.

Genera 
The following genera are recognized in the family Philinoglossidae:
 Abavopsis Salvini-Plawen, 1973
 Philinoglossa Hertling, 1932
 Pluscula Er. Marcus, 1953
 Sapha Marcus, 1959

References